Virginia's 63rd House of Delegates district elects one of 100 seats in the Virginia House of Delegates, the lower house of the state's bicameral legislature. District 63 represents the city of Petersburg as well as part of the city of Hopewell and parts of the counties of Chesterfield, Dinwiddie, and Prince George. The seat is currently held by Kim Taylor.

List of delegates

References

Virginia House of Delegates districts
Petersburg, Virginia
Hopewell, Virginia
Government in Chesterfield County, Virginia
Dinwiddie County, Virginia
Prince George County, Virginia